Cycling Victoria, CV, is the peak governing body for organised competitive and recreational cycling within Victoria, Australia. CV is an affiliate of Cycling Australia (CA) and the UCI (International Cycling Union) and currently has 65 affiliated clubs and over 6,000 members throughout Victoria.

History 
Cycling Victoria can trace its history back to pre-federation Australia. The League of Victorian Wheelman (LVW) was first founded in 1893 as a professional cycling body. The Victorian Amateur Cyclists' Union (VACU) was founded in May 1917 to promote the interests of amateur cyclists in Victoria. The VACU would change in name to the Victorian Cycling Federation (VCF) in 1986. The VCF and the LVW merged in 1986 to become Victorian Cycling Incorporated, which was changed to CycleSport Victoria in the 1990s. In 2011 CycleSport Victoria became Cycling Victoria.

Affiliated clubs

References

External links
 Cycling Victoria website

Cycle racing in Australia
Cycling in Victoria (Australia)
Sports organizations established in 1893